Dichomeris aurisulcata is a moth in the family Gelechiidae. It was described by Edward Meyrick in 1922. It is found in Amazonas, Brazil.

The forewings are dark violet fuscous, the costa more blue tinged and with variable more or less expressed ochreous-yellow or orange streaks between the veins, sometimes only slightly indicated, one along the fold sometimes strong. There is a roundish dark fuscous blotch in the disc before the middle, and a sub-oblique transverse blotch at three-fifths, these are sometimes partially edged with orange or wholly orange. The terminal edge is orange. The hindwings are dark fuscous.

References

Moths described in 1922
aurisulcat